The Democratic Party of the United States is a big tent party composed of various factions. The liberal faction supports modern liberalism that began with the New Deal in the 1930s and the Great Society in the 1960s. The moderate faction supports Third Way politics that includes center-left social policies and centrist fiscal policies. The progressive faction supports social democracy and left-wing populism in addition to social liberalism. The conservative faction supports centre-right policies, though it lost much of its influence in the 21st century.

Democrats in Congress organize into caucuses based on political ideology, with some overlap in caucus memberships. The Blue Dog Coalition represents conservative and moderate Democrats, the New Democrat Coalition represents moderate and liberal Democrats, and the Congressional Progressive Caucus represents liberal and progressive Democrats.

Liberals 

Liberalism in the US began during the Progressive Era with President Theodore Roosevelt (a Republican) and his Square Deal and New Nationalism policies, with center-left ideas increasingly leaning toward the political philosophy of social liberalism, or better known in the United States as modern liberalism. The Wilson administration saw the enactment of the New Freedom, a package of progressive social programs. The rise of the women's suffrage movement, opposed by Southern Democrats but supported by Republicans and Wilson, saw the passage of the Nineteenth Amendment to the United States Constitution and a push for civil rights legislation on the basis of gender. 

In the 1940s, liberal Democrats began pushing for desegregation and civil rights legislation for racial minorities, and in the 1960s, for immigration reform and gun control. Beyond Franklin D. Roosevelt's New Deal, Democratic presidents advocated landmark liberal programs. Beginning in the 1970s, liberal Democrats emphasized civil rights for disabled people, consumer protection, environmentalism, LGBT rights, reproductive rights, and ending capital punishment. Following Roosevelt's New Deal, Harry S. Truman's Fair Deal, John F. Kennedy's New Frontier and Lyndon B. Johnson's Great Society (the latter of which established Medicare and Medicaid) further established the popularity of liberalism in the nation. Kennedy's Vice President Lyndon B. Johnson's (who became President after Kennedy's assassination) 1960's Great Society initiatives marked the peak of modern liberalism in the second half of the 20th century.

While the resurgence of conservatism and the Third Way of Bill Clinton's New Democrats briefly weakened the influence of social liberalism, Barack Obama acted as an ideological bridge. While characterizing himself as a New Democrat, Obama towed the ideological line between the Third Way and modern liberalism. The key legislative achievement of the Obama administration, the passage and enactment of the Patient Protection and Affordable Care Act (Obamacare), was generally supported among liberal Democrats, though it drew inspiration from Mitt Romney's plan as governor of Massachusetts and did not have a public option due to conservative Democrat Joe Lieberman. 

Under Obama, Democrats achieved an expansion of LGBT rights, federal hate crime laws, rescinding the Mexico City Policy, later reinstituted by President Donald Trump, rescinding the ban on federal taxpayer dollars to fund research on embryonic stem cells, Joint Comprehensive Plan of Action and the Cuban thaw. In the 2010s, many Democrats began pushing for the legalization of cannabis, succeeding in several states. Barack Obama did not crack down on states that legalized cannabis during his presidency. Other prominent Democrats in Congress, such as John Lewis, openly advocated for liberal causes and even self-identified as such–the nonpartisan organization On the Issues also characterizing Lewis in 2000 as a "Hard-Core Liberal".

In 2011, the Democratic Leadership Council, which supported more centrist and Third Way positions, was dissolved. In 2016, Democratic presidential nominee Hillary Clinton eschewed her husband's "New Covenant" centrism for more liberal proposals such as rolling back mandatory minimum sentencing laws, a debt-free college tuition plan for public university students, and a pathway to citizenship for undocumented immigrants. Moreover, Joe Biden, despite having largely been a centrist over the course of his career, has increasingly adopted more social liberal policies during his presidency. 

Both Secretary of Transportation Pete Buttigieg and Vice President Kamala Harris have been described as "pragmatic progressives," due to having advocated for fairly progressive policies, although the plans have tended to be more modest and transitionary in implementation when compared to the more sweeping changes generally proposed in the progressive wing. Such policies referred to as "pragmatic progressive"  include those such as Buttigieg's proposed plan in his 2020 presidential campaign for a public option to operate as a "glide path" to eventual Medicare for All, a policy proposal which is more in line with the mainstream of modern liberalism rather than those associated with Sanders on the progressive side.

Moderates 

The Third Way is a centrist political movement that can trace some of its origins to pro-Vietnam war moderate Hubert Humphrey winning of the Democratic presidential nomination over anti-Vietnam war progressive Eugene McCarthy in the 1968 United States presidential election as well as angst following the landslide victory of Republican Ronald Reagan over the more left-leaning Democrat Walter Mondale at the 1984 presidential election. Most Third Way centrism in America is associated with reconciling centre-left social policies with centre-right economic approaches, mostly associated in the U.S. with the presidency of Bill Clinton and the New Democrats. 

During the Cold War, the Democratic movement became anti-communist. The success of purer social liberalism was weakened with the presidency of Ronald Reagan and the ensuing tide of conservative popularity in response to a perception of liberal failure. The Clinton Administration responded by adopting a synthesis of right-wing and left-wing ideas in the Third Way. During the 1992 United States presidential election, Bill Clinton and Al Gore, both members of the Democratic Leadership Council, each ran as a New Democrat, positioning themselves as Democrats willing to synthesize fiscally conservative views with the more culturally liberal position of the Democratic Party ethos, or to harmonize center-left and center-right politics. Bill Clinton was both the first Democrat elected President since the 1970s and the first elected to a second full-term since the 1940s. 

In 1994, Clinton signed the Violent Crime Control and Law Enforcement Act. One of Clinton's key Third Way achievements was the 1996 Personal Responsibility and Work Opportunity Act, representing a substantial change in welfare and workfare in the nation. Despite indications of cultural liberality, though, the Clinton Administration signed many controversial cultural bills into law, including the 1996 Defense of Marriage Act and Don't Ask, Don't Tell ban on openly gay service in the Armed Forces. Clinton also presided over a period of free trade and deregulation in the United States economy, such as the North American Free Trade Agreement, the Gramm–Leach–Bliley Act (GLBA), Commodity Futures Modernization Act of 2000, and the Telecommunications Act of 1996.

Most moderate Democrats in the House of Representatives are members of the New Democrat Coalition, although there is considerable overlap in the membership of New Democrats and Blue Dogs, with most Blue Dogs also being New Democrats. Presidents Barack Obama and Joe Biden have largely tried to bridge the gap and unify the wings of the Democratic Party while still addressing the goals of the liberal wing, and the Third Way is still a large coalition in the modern Democratic Party.

Progressives 

The modern progressive movement in the U.S. draws deeply from the left-wing populist economic and political philosophies of Franklin Roosevelt's New Deal and Woodrow Wilson's New Freedom, the latter occurring at the end of the Progressive Era, which was largely started by Republican President Theodore Roosevelt and his Square Deal. While Wilson and Theodore Roosevelt considered themselves progressives, Franklin Roosevelt only referred to himself as a liberal. Modern progressives are much more culturally liberal on social issues like race and identity, where they draw inspiration from the Civil and Voting Rights Acts proposed by President John F. Kennedy, enacted by President Johnson and advocated for by Dr. King.

While it does not transcend the political philosophy of social liberalism, the Progressive wing has fused tenets of social liberalism with traditions of the Progressive Era as well as drawing more robustly from Keynesian economics, social populism, and social democracy. Progressive Democratic candidates for public office have had popular support as candidates in metropolitan areas outside the South. The first self-described liberal president was Franklin D. Roosevelt whose ideas, such as his calls for a second Bill of Rights, continue to influence progressives today. 

President Lyndon Johnson and Civil Rights activists such as Martin Luther King Jr. are influential to progressives as well, not only for their positions on race and identity but on economics as well (Johnson for the Great Society and King for his support of social democracy). The writings of  thinkers such as John Dewey and Lester Frank Ward helped shape liberal and progressive ideas in the United States. While there are differences between them, both historical progressivism and the modern movement have the most crossover in the belief that free markets lead to economic inequalities and therefore the free market must be aggressively monitored and regulated with broad economic and social rights in order to protect the working class. 

Modern progressives seriously emphasize the threat of climate change and rally around the Green New Deal, which was created by Rep. Ocasio Cortez and Sen. Markey, as the framework forward to tackle the issue. Progressive Democrats have also been described as constituting the most robust anti-establishment wing of the party in the sense that they "see part of their role as not just attacking Republicans, but also highlighting what they see as shortcomings of the Democratic Party itself." 

Many progressive Democrats are ideological descendants of the New Left of Democratic presidential candidate and Senator George McGovern of South Dakota, while others were involved in the presidential candidacies of Vermont Governor Howard Dean and U.S. Representative Dennis Kucinich of Ohio. Still others are former members of the Green Party. This group consists disproportionately of college-educated professionals. A 2014 study by the Pew Research Center found that a plurality (41%) resided in mass affluent households and 49% were college graduates. 

The Congressional Progressive Caucus (CPC) is a caucus of progressive House Democrats in the Congress, along with one independent in the Senate. It is the second largest Democratic caucus in the House of Representatives and its members have included Representatives Dennis Kucinich (OH), Alan Grayson (FL), John Conyers (MI), Barbara Lee (CA), Jim McDermott (WA), Peter DeFazio (OR), Keith Ellison (MN), Ayanna Pressley (MA), Ro Khanna (CA), Mark Pocan (WI),  and John Lewis (GA). Senators Elizabeth Warren and Ed Markey (MA), Russ Feingold and Tammy Baldwin (WI), Jeff Merkley (OR), and Sherrod Brown (OH) have all been described as progressives. Other notable progressives include Henry A. Wallace, Eugene McCarthy, Ted Kennedy, Paul Wellstone, and Stacey Abrams. 

In 2016, the Blue Collar Caucus, a pro-labor, anti-outsourcing Caucus was formed, with significant overlap in members with the Progressive Caucus, although some moderates such as Cheri Bustos are members as well. There are six self-described democratic socialists in the United States Congress as of 2021: Senator Bernie Sanders of Vermont, Representative Danny K. Davis of Illinois, Representative Alexandria Ocasio-Cortez and Jamaal Bowman of New York, Representative Rashida Tlaib of Michigan, and Representative Cori Bush of Missouri, although political scientists have noted that their policy platforms have tended to align more with social democracy. All self-described democratic socialists in Congress are members of the Democratic Party, except for Senator Sanders, who was a member of the party for his 2016 and 2020 presidential campaigns but caucuses with the Senate Democrats as an Independent.

Conservatives 

The conservative coalition was an unofficial coalition in the United States Congress bringing together a conservative majority of the Republican Party and the conservative, mostly Southern wing of the Democratic Party. It was dominant in Congress from 1937 to 1963 and remained a political force until the mid-1980s, eventually dying out in the 1990s. In terms of Congressional roll call votes, it primarily appeared on votes affecting labor unions. The conservative coalition did not operate on civil rights bills, for the two wings had opposing viewpoints. 

However, the coalition did have the power to prevent unwanted bills from even coming to a vote. The coalition included many committee chairmen from the South who blocked bills by not reporting them from their committees. Furthermore, Howard W. Smith, Chairman of the House Rules Committee, often could kill a bill simply by not reporting it out with a favorable rule (he lost some of that power in 1961).

Today, conservative Democrats are generally regarded as the most conservative members of the Democratic Party as a whole. The Blue Dog Coalition was originally founded as a group of conservative Democrats. After reaching a peak of 59 members in 2008, the caucus was reduced following the 2010 election to only 26 members. The caucus has adopted more liberal stances on social issues in recent years. The Coalition remains the most conservative grouping of Democrats in the house, broadly adopting socially liberal and fiscally conservative policies and promoting fiscal restraint, although some members retain socially conservative views. As of March 2023, 8 House members are part of the Blue Dog Coalition.

Historical factions 
Historical factions of the Democratic Party include the founding Jacksonians; the Copperheads and War Democrats during the American Civil War; the Redeemers, Bourbon Democrats, and Silverites in the late-19th century; and the Southern Democrats and New Deal Democrats in the 20th century.

Early Democratic Party 
Jeffersonians, named after founding father Thomas Jefferson, was a political movement in the late 18th and early 19th centuries. While it dominated the first party system which predates the Democratic Party, many of its beliefs influenced the party throughout the 19th century. These beliefs were concentrated around the beliefs of republicanism and agrarianism. Other than Jefferson, early notable Jeffersonians included presidents James Madison and James Monroe of the Virginia dynasty.

Jacksonianism was the foundational ideology of the Democratic Party with the election of Andrew Jackson as president in 1828, and it was the predominant faction of the party until the 1840s. It represented the politics of Jackson, which were a modified form of Jeffersonianism. Jacksonians supported a small federal government and stronger state governments. They were also opponents of central banking, which represented an early factional division in the Democratic Party when Jacksonians competed against pro-bank Democrats. Jacksonians supported the Southern United States on several issues, including slavery, arguing that it was permissible on the grounds of states' rights, and protective tariffs, opposing them on the grounds that they disproportionately benefited the North. Other than Jackson, notable Jacksonian Democrats include presidents Martin Van Buren and James K. Polk.

The Young America movement was a political as well as a societal movement in the 1830s throughout the 1850s. While not an explicit political faction, it did impact many Democratic party ideals though its promotion of capitalism and manifest destiny and broke with the agrarian and strict constructionist orthodoxies of the past; it embraced commerce, technology, regulation, reform, and internationalism. Notable promoters included President Franklin Pierce and 1860 presidential nominee Stephen Douglas.

The Civil War and Reconstruction
The Free Soil Party had many former members of the Democratic Party, most notably their 1848 presidential candidate former Democratic president Martin Van Buren. The party's main platform was opposition to the expansion of slavery into new territories acquired from the Mexican–American War.

During the American Civil War, the Democratic Party split into several factions: 
 The Fire-Eaters were Southern Democrats who promoted the idea of Southern secession prior to the American Civil War. They sought to preserve slavery throughout the United States. 
 Copperheads (or Peace Democrats) were a faction of Northern Democrats during the American Civil War which sought an immediate end to the war. Many copperheads sympathized with the Confederacy, with members accused by Republicans as treasonous. They promoted the ideas of agrarianism inspired from Jacksonian thought which appealed to many poor farmers in border states.
 The War Democrats were a group of Democrats that opposed the Copperheads and supported President Abraham Lincoln's stance towards the South. The War Democrats allied with Republicans under the National Union ticket to compete in the 1864 elections.

Redeemers were Southern Democrats that, after the end of the Civil War, sought to return white supremacists to power in the South. They were opposed to the expansion of rights given to Black Americans and were associated with groups such as the White League, Red Shirts, and the Ku Klux Klan.

Gilded, Progressive, and New Deal eras 
Following the end of the Civil War and into the early 20th century, several factions emerged in the democratic party during the Third Party System such as the Bourbon Democrats (1870s–1900s) and Silverites (1870s–1890s), as well as during the Fourth and Fifth Party Systems with the Progressives (1890s–1910s), and the New Deal coalition (1930s-1960s). 

During the Gilded Age, or from around 1877 to 1896, the only Democratic President to win both the Electoral College and popular vote was Grover Cleveland (1885-1889 and 1893-1897). Also, during the Progressive Era and Roaring Twenties from around 1896 to 1929 the only Democratic President was Woodrow Wilson (1913-1921). Wilson imposed racial segregation in the federal government. It was only until after the Great Depression and World War II that the Democratic Party began to support civil rights, starting with President Harry Truman desegregating the United States Armed Forces in 1948.

Southern Democrats 

Throughout the 20th century, Southern factions within the democratic party emerged and held significant power around the issue of civil rights, segregation, and other issues. These included the conservative coalition (1930s–1960s), the Solid South (1870s–1960s), Dixiecrats (1940s), and the boll weevils (1980s). Both Jimmy Carter (39th President of the United States from 1977-1981) and Bill Clinton (42nd President of the United States from 1993-2001) were from Southern States, specifically  Georgia and Arkansas respectively. Also, until the 1994 "Republican Revolution", Democrats were the majority of Southern members in the United States House of Representatives. 

Even in 2009, Southern Democrats still controlled both branches of the Alabama General Assembly, the Arkansas General Assembly, the Delaware General Assembly, the Louisiana State Legislature, the Maryland General Assembly, the Mississippi Legislature, the North Carolina General Assembly, the West Virginia Legislature, the Council of the District of Columbia, the Kentucky House of Representatives, and the Virginia Senate. 

But by 2017, Southern Democrats only retained control of both branches of the Delaware General Assembly, the Maryland General Assembly, and the Council of the District of Columbia; they had lost control of the state legislatures in Alabama, Arkansas, Louisiana, Mississippi, North Carolina, and West Virginia.  In the 2020 United States presidential election, Joe Biden won the Southern States of Delaware,  Georgia, Maryland, and Virginia along with the District of Columbia. Biden has resided in Delaware over his public career, considered by the Census Bureau to be a Southern State, although Biden was born in Scranton, Pennsylvania to an Irish Catholic family.

Congressional caucuses 
The following table lists coalitions' electoral results for the House of Representatives:

See also
 Political positions of the Democratic Party
 Demographics of the Democratic Party (United States)
 Democratic Party (United States) organizations
 Unofficial organizations for Democrats
 Libertarian Democrat
 Republican Party
 Factions in the Republican Party
 Libertarian Party
 Factions in the Libertarian Party

References

External links
 21st Century Democrats
 AFL-CIO
 Blue Dog Coalition
 Change to Win Federation
 Democracy For America
 Democrats For Life of America
 Progressive Democrats of America
 National Education Association

 
Democratic Party (United States)